is a Japanese baseball coach and retired pitcher. He played in Nippon Professional Baseball (NPB) for the Yomiuri Giants, Chunichi Dragons, and Orix Blue Wave from 1976 through 1993.

In 1981, Nishimoto won the Eiji Sawamura Award. Winning the 1981 Japan Series, he was named the Japan Series Most Valuable Player.

Nishimoto won seven straight Gold Glove Awards from 1979 through 1985. He won the Nippon Professional Baseball Comeback Player of the Year Award in 1989.

After his retirement as a player, Nishimoto coached for the Hanshin Tigers and the Chiba Lotte Marines. In 2013, he coached the Orix Buffaloes.

His brother, Akikazu Nishimoto, played in NPB.

References

External links

1956 births
Living people
People from Matsuyama, Ehime
Japanese baseball players
Nippon Professional Baseball pitchers
Yomiuri Giants players
Chunichi Dragons players
Orix BlueWave players
Japanese baseball coaches
Nippon Professional Baseball coaches